Cristian Romero is a Colombian writer. He studied Audiovisual Communication and Multimedia at the Universidad de Antioquia. He published his short stories in the literary magazine of the Universidad de Antioquia. His first book of stories Ahora solo queda la ciudad came out in 2016. This was followed by his first novel Después de la ira.

He has gained recognition for his writing, e.g. he was finalist in a national short story competition organized by La Cueva of Barranquilla, and he won second place in a short story competition under the aegis of the Festival de Literatura de Pereira.

In 2017, he was named by the Hay Festival as one of the Bogotá39, a selection of the best young writers in Latin America.

References

Colombian writers
Year of birth missing (living people)
Living people